Austin Noah Abrams (born September 2, 1996) is an American actor. He is known for his roles as Ron Anderson in the fifth and sixth seasons of the television series The Walking Dead (2015–2016), as Ethan Daley in Euphoria (since 2019) and as Dash in Dash & Lily (2020). He has also appeared in films such as The Kings of Summer (2013), Paper Towns (2015), Brad's Status (2017), Scary Stories to Tell in the Dark (2019) and Chemical Hearts (2020).

Early life
Abrams was raised in Sarasota, Florida, and is the son of Lori and Bradley Abrams, who are doctors. He is Jewish.

Abrams began taking acting lessons when he was five years old, and started appearing in theater productions at the age of nine. His first film role was in Ticking Clock.

Career
Austin is known for playing Ron Anderson in the AMC television series The Walking Dead during its fifth and sixth seasons. In 2017, he co-starred in Kyle Wilamowski's film All Summers End, playing Hunter Gorski, a scruffy 16-year-old who pays little attention to his best friend Conrad's first love.

In 2017, Abrams starred as Troy in the comedy-drama Brad's Status. Abrams portrayed Jackson Barber on The Americans in 2018. In 2019, he had a major role in the horror book adaptation Scary Stories to Tell in the Dark, and in 2020, he was the lead in the Amazon teen romance film Chemical Hearts. He also played the main role in the Netflix series Dash & Lily. Since 2019, Abrams has portrayed Ethan in Euphoria.

Filmography

Film

Television

References

External links
 

1996 births
21st-century American male actors
Actors from Sarasota, Florida
American male child actors
American male film actors
American male stage actors
American male television actors
Jewish American male actors
Living people
Male actors from Florida
Place of birth missing (living people)